Ibrahim Tanko (born 30 April 1999) is a Ghanaian professional footballer who plays as a forward for Javor Ivanjica.

Career
Tanko was born in Ghanaian capital Accra. In January 2016, Ghana Premier League outfit WAFA signed Tanko. He made his professional debut on 20 February against Asante Kotoko, which was followed by his first goal versus Ebusua Dwarfs on 24 April. That was his sole goal in thirteen appearances during 2016. Then, Tanko had a spell with Mighty Jets of Nigeria. On 21 August 2017, Serbian SuperLiga side Red Star Belgrade completed the signing of Tanko. August 2018 saw Tanko leave on loan to Bežanija of the Serbian First League.

Following his release from Red Star at the end of the 2018/19 season, Tanko joined Mladost Lučani on a three-year deal. He departed after one campaign, having appeared twelve times. On 2 July 2020, Tanko moved across the Serbian SuperLiga to Javor Ivanjica. He made his debut on 31 July, as his new side lost 2–1 to his former employers Mladost Lučani.

Career statistics
.

References

External links

1999 births
Living people
Footballers from Accra
Ghanaian footballers
Association football forwards
Ghanaian expatriate footballers
Expatriate footballers in Nigeria
Expatriate footballers in Serbia
Ghanaian expatriate sportspeople in Nigeria
Ghanaian expatriate sportspeople in Serbia
Ghana Premier League players
Serbian First League players
Serbian SuperLiga players
Mighty Jets F.C. players
West African Football Academy players
Red Star Belgrade footballers
FK Bežanija players
FK Mladost Lučani players
FK Javor Ivanjica players